Acacia hadrophylla is a shrub of the genus Acacia and the subgenus Plurinerves that is endemic to south western Australia.

Description
The has hairy branchlets and, like most species of Acacia has phyllodes rather than true leaves. The thick, rigid and evergreen phyllodes have an oblong-elliptic shape and are slightly incurved. It blooms from June to September and produces yellow flowers.

Distribution
It is native to an area in the southern Wheatbelt and Goldfields-Esperance regions of Western Australia where it is commonly situated on undulating plains growing in sandy, loamy and clay loam soils. It has a scattered distribution from around Mount Holland and Lake King in the west to around Kumarl and Scaddan in the east where it is often a part of open scrub and shrubland mallee communities.

See also
 List of Acacia species

References

hadrophylla
Acacias of Western Australia
Taxa named by Bruce Maslin